Brazil competed at the Deaflympics for the first time in 1993. Since then Brazil has been regularly participating at the Deaflympics. Brazil won its first Deaflympics medal in 2009. Brazil  has competed for the first time at Winter Deaflympics on the 2019 Winter Games at the Sondrio Province in Italy.

Medal tallies

Summer Deaflympics

Winter Deaflympics

See also 
Brazil at the Paralympics
Brazil at the Olympics

References

External links 
2017 Deaflympics